Beth Couture (born July 27, 1962) was the head women's basketball coach at Butler University. From her first season at Butler in 2002–2003 through the 2011–2012 season, she compiled a 161–144 record including three consecutive WNIT appearances and four consecutive 20-win seasons, including a 23–10 mark in 2010, the most wins in team history. In 2007, Couture's contract at Butler was extended through the 2011–12 season.

Coaching history
Beth Couture began coaching on the collegiate level when she became the head volleyball coach at Presbyterian College in 1987.  Between 1987 and 1994, she obtained a record of 233–50, was named SAC Volleyball coach of the year three times, and guided the Blue Hose volleyball team to three national tournaments, including the school’s first-ever NCAA postseason appearance in 1993.

In addition to volleyball, Couture coached women's basketball on the collegiate level beginning in 1987, spending two seasons as an assistant at Presbyterian College from 1987 to 1989, arriving after three years at as the head coach at Dixie High School in Due West, South Carolina, where she posted a 49–28 record.  She was first named head coach for the 1989–90 season at Presbyterian. After thirteen seasons, Couture compiled a 258–117 (.688) overall record, including eight 20-win seasons. In addition, she led the program to the NCAA Division II national tournament six times in her final nine years.  Further, Couture served as an assistant director of athletics from 1993–2002, until taking her position at Butler.

Couture also held the Beth Couture Basketball Camp each summer at Butler University.

Personal life and education
Originally from Greenville, SC, Couture was a four-time women's basketball MVP at Erskine College, where she graduated in 1984.  She was also selected as a Kodak All-American honoree as a senior and was inducted into the Erskine College Hall of Fame in December 1989.  After earning her bachelor's degree in Physical Education at Erskine, Couture earned her master's degree in the same field at Furman University in 1987.

During Butler's most successful women's basketball season to date in 2009–10, Couture battled breast cancer, eventually entering radiation therapy following a mastectomy after undergoing chemotherapy.  She was diagnosed with stage 2 breast cancer in April 2009. Since entering remission in 2010, Couture is one of the Indianapolis community's leaders in the fight against the disease, participating in several breast cancer awareness events. She walked 38 miles over a two-day span for St. Vincent's Weekend to End Breast Cancer, was the 2011 honorary chairwoman for the St. Vincent Woman of Hope group, and was named a 2010 Woman of Distinction by Butler University.  During the men's NCAA Final Four in 2010, she and Butler Men's Basketball Coach Brad Stevens attended the annual Coaches vs. Cancer dinner together. In September 2010, Couture and the Butler women's basketball team raised $7,145 for breast cancer research  and Couture walked 38 miles over a two-day span as part of Saint Vincent's Weekend to End Breast Cancer. In addition, the women's basketball team has worn pink uniforms to raise breast cancer awareness.

Head coaching record

Women's basketball

Women's volleyball

References

Living people
1962 births
American women's basketball coaches
American women's basketball players
Butler Bulldogs women's basketball coaches
Place of birth missing (living people)
Erskine College alumni
21st-century American women
Presbyterian Blue Hose women's basketball coaches